Johan Jeremiassen (8 January 1843- 25 January 1889) was a Norwegian entrepreneur, ship-owner, consul and politician. He established the porcelain flatware company. Porsgrund Porselænsfabrik.

Personal life
Johan Jeremiassen was born at Kviteseid in Telemark. He was the son of  Knut Johan Jeremiassen and Ingeborg Ellse, née Helseth. His father was the manager of Kviteseid Seminar which was in operation from 1819 until 1889. The family moved to Drammen around 1855. 

Johan moved to Kristiania (now Oslo) in the 1860s, where he made a career in manufacturing, and later moved with his wife to her hometown of Porsgrund in 1872 where he became involved in shipping. His brother Herman Jeremiassen moved with him and became a businessperson, as well as mayor.

In 1870 Johan Jeremiassen married Ellen Serine Knudsen (1846–1937), the daughter of ship-owner Christen Knudsen (1813-1888). She was the sister of  Jørgen Christian Knudsen and Gunnar Knudsen who operated the shipping company, J.C. og G. Knudsen.  

Serine Jeremiassen was elected as one of the first women to serve in Porsgrund municipal council, representing a temperance group Afholdsvennenes Liste, in 1907.

Career
Jeremiassen was a notable and successful ship-owner. Jeremiassen also was vice mayor of Porsgrund municipality from 1885 to 1888. He additional served as the German consul for Skiensfjorden.In 1885 he took the initiative to establishing Porsgrund Porselænsfabrik. He died four years later during 1889 at 46  years of age.

References

Related reading
Ada Buch Polak (1980) Gammelt Porsgrund Porselen  (C. Huitfeldt Forlag AS)

External links
Porsgrunds Porselænsfabrik  website

1843 births
1889 deaths
People from Porsgrunn
Politicians from Telemark
Norwegian company founders
Norwegian industrialists
Norwegian businesspeople in shipping